DUSA Pharmaceuticals, Inc., owned by Sun Pharma, is a pharmaceutical company with dermatology products, including  Levulan and Nicomide.

In the first quarter of 2006, DUSA Pharmaceuticals obtained Sirius Laboratories in a merger estimated to be worth 30 million dollars.  Sirius was a privately held dermatology specialty pharmaceuticals company founded by Dr. Joel E. Bernstein in 2000 dedicated to the treatment of acne vulgaris and acne rosacea.

In 2012, Caraco Pharmaceutical Laboratories (CPL), a subsidiary of Sun Pharmaceutical, acquired DUSA.

External links
official web site.

References 

Companies based in Wilmington, Massachusetts
Companies formerly listed on the Nasdaq